George Corrie may refer to:

 George Corrie (footballer) (born 1973), English footballer
 George Corrie (priest) (1793–1885), English churchman and academic